Wadi an-Naaim (Arabic: وادي النعيم) is a Syrian village in the Yabroud District of the Rif Dimashq Governorate. According to the Syria Central Bureau of Statistics (CBS), Wadi an-Naaim had a population of 125 in the 2004 census.

References

External links

Populated places in Yabroud District